Alamogordo Daily News, founded in 1898, is a daily newspaper published in Alamogordo, New Mexico. It carries local news as well as syndicated content from Associated Press and others.

History 

Alamogordo Daily News claims 1898 as its founding date, but a case can be made for 1896. A predecessor, the Chief, was founded in Tularosa as a weekly in 1896, then moved to La Luz the next year and changed its name to Sacramento Chief. It was sold to the Alamogordo Printing Company in 1899 and continued under the same name briefly before becoming the Alamogordo News.

The paper continued as a weekly until the 1950s when it went daily.

The paper has been sold several times. Recently it was sold by Community Newspaper Holdings to MediaNews Group in 2001.

The paper is part of the Texas-New Mexico Newspapers Partnership, a joint venture formed in 2003 between MediaNews Group and Gannett, with MediaNews Group the managing partner.

The paper was an evening paper until September 1, 2006, published weekday evenings and Sunday mornings. It then switched to a morning paper, published daily except Mondays.
 In 2015, Gannett acquired full ownership of the Texas-New Mexico Newspapers Partnership.

The paper regularly wins awards from the New Mexico Press Association

and from the New Mexico Associated Press Managing Editors.

Features

Coverage 

Alamogordo Daily News is primarily a local newspaper. It has a staff of reporters and news editor to write local news. It also carries state, local, and national news from the Associated Press. It covers the city of Alamogordo and the neighboring village of Tularosa. The other incorporated area in Otero County, Cloudcroft, has its own newspaper, the Mountain Monthly, and does not get much coverage in this paper.

The paper publishes and shares some content with a free weekly tabloid, Hollogram, at nearby Holloman Air Force Base covering happenings on base.

Major sections 

The paper is published in two sections:
 A: local news; weather; an Opinion page; an extensive listing of coming events
 B: sports; state, national, and international news (sometimes split with section A); comics; classified ads

There are several weekly editorial inserts (in addition to advertising inserts):
 Wednesday: As Seen on TV, a locally produced tabloid based on content from zip2it.com; complete TV listings and some feature stories
 Thursday: American Profile, a national rotogravure magazine published by Publishing Group of America
 Friday: Vámonos, an arts, entertainment, and dining tabloid covering Otero and Lincoln Counties; published by and appearing in Alamogordo Daily News and in Ruidoso News
 Sunday: USA Weekend, a national rotogravure magazine published by Gannett

The Opinion page combines editorials, editorial cartoons, op-ed pieces, letters to the editor, and occasionally short feature articles written by community members.

Recurring features 

There are full-page sections of photos and press releases that appear once or twice a week:
 "¿Qué Pasa?" features upcoming or just-passed local events
 "Celebrate" features wedding announcements, anniversaries, promotions, etc.
 "Kudos" covers awards and other notable achievements

There are regular columns on gardening, on Alamogordo Public Schools, on Alamogordo Public Library, on animals in the Alameda Park Zoo, and on Otero County Community Health Council.  "New Mexico Tally", a roll call from Thomas Voting Reports of how New Mexico's Congressional delegation voted on the most important bills, appears each Saturday.

Web site 

The paper's web site carries all the locally-written editorial content. It is updated once or twice daily with breaking news stories that will appear in tomorrow's print edition. There is also an official newspaper blog.

Editorial position 

Alamogordo Daily News rarely prints unsigned editorials or expresses an official editorial position. The few it publishes usually deal with endorsements for an election. For example, in the March 2008 municipal election it endorsed a candidate in the only contested City Commission race and endorsed a bond issue for street maintenance.
 
In 2006 it made endorsements for all races in the November general election.

The paper runs a lead editorial in each issue, but they are nearly all reprinted from other newspapers, particularly other MediaNews Group papers. There is no editorial cartoonist, but each issue carries an editorial cartoon from the Copley News Service. The syndicated columnist Jay Miller from Santa Fe appears frequently with his "Inside the Capitol" column about New Mexico politics.

Newspaper staffers occasionally write signed opinion pieces, and while these are not official positions they are featured prominently on the Opinion page. For example, in 2007 there was a contentious bill before the State Legislature to prohibit smoking in most indoor public places and work places. The paper did not take a position on this, but it published signed opinion pieces against the bill by the Assistant Editor

and for the bill by the Publisher.

See also 

Aubrey Dunn, Sr., New Mexico state senator and partial owner of Alamogordo Daily News
Atari video game burial, which was first reported on by the Alamogordo Daily News

Notes

External links
 Official website
 Official mobile website

Newspapers published in New Mexico
Publications established in 1898
Alamogordo, New Mexico
Gannett publications
1898 establishments in New Mexico Territory